Open Season is a remix album by Canadian singer and songwriter Feist.  Released in April 2006, it was rumored to be a Canadian-only release. The second version was released July 18, 2006.

The album contains alternative versions and remixes of songs from her award-winning album Let It Die, including collaborations with Peaches, The Postal Service, k-os and Kings of Convenience.

Track listing
 "One Evening" (Gonzales solo piano)
 "Inside + Out" (Apostle of Hustle unmix live at the BBC)
 "Mushaboom" (Mocky mix)
 "Gatekeeper" (One Room One Hour mix)
 "Lonely Lonely" (Frisbee'd mix)
 "Mushaboom" (k-os mix)
 "Snow Lion" (with Readymade FC)
 ""
 "The Simple Story" (with Jane Birkin)
 "Lovertits" (with Gonzales)
 "Mushaboom" (The Postal Service mix)
 "Gatekeeper" (Do Right mix)
 "One Evening" (VV mix)
 "When I Was a Young Girl" (VV mix)
 "Mushaboom" (VV mix)

References

Feist (singer) albums
2006 remix albums
Arts & Crafts (record label) remix albums
Polydor Records remix albums